Ahmed Akee Longmire (born October 11, 1999) is an American professional soccer player who plays as a defender for Major League Soccer club Nashville SC.

Career

Youth and college 
Longmire attended Centennial High School, also playing club soccer for six years with local side Heat FC, and a single year with the Las Vegas Soccer Academy.

In 2018, Longmire attended Utah Valley University to play college soccer. In two seasons with the Wolverines, Longmire made 39 appearances and tallied a single assist. His sophomore season saw him earn First-team All-WAC honors and was named to the United Soccer Coaches All-Far West Region third team. In 2020, Longmire transferred to the University of California, Los Angeles, going on to appear 20 times for the Bruins. Longmire was named 2020-21 Pac-12 All-Conference Second Team, and a 2021 Pac-12 All-Conference honorable mention.

Professional
On January 11, 2022, Longmire was selected 10th overall in the 2022 MLS SuperDraft by Nashville SC. Nashville traded up to pick Longmire, sending Colorado Rapids $125,000 in General Allocation Money, with a potential $50,000 added if Longmire reaches certain performance metrics, as well as the 26th overall pick.

On June 16, 2022, Longmire joined USL Championship side Orange County SC on loan. He made his debut on June 18, 2022, starting in a 3–1 loss at Louisville City.

References

External links 
Ahmed Longmire at MLS

1999 births
Living people
American soccer players
Association football defenders
Nashville SC players
Nashville SC draft picks
Orange County SC players
Soccer players from Nevada
Sportspeople from Las Vegas
UCLA Bruins men's soccer players
USL Championship players
Utah Valley Wolverines men's soccer players